Santiago Benítez (1903–1997) was a Paraguayan footballer that played as a midfielder.

Career
Benítez was part of the Paraguay national football team that participated in the 1930 FIFA World Cup. During most of his career he played for Olimpia Asunción and was a key member of the three consecutive national championships obtained by Olimpia in 1927, 1928 and 1929.

References

1903 births
1930 FIFA World Cup players
Paraguayan footballers
Club Olimpia footballers
Paraguay international footballers
1997 deaths
Association football midfielders